Zurcherella is a Lower Cretaceous (Upper Barremian - Upper Aptian desmoceratid ammonite from France and Colombia (Apón and Yuruma Formations, La Guajira). Its shell is moderately compressed and rather involute (outer whorls covering most of the inner), with fine sinuous ribs that arise some distance above the umbilical rim. Zurcherella differs from its descendant Uhligella in that in the latter, ribs arise from the umbilical shoulder.

Zurcherella is the earliest of the desmoceratid subfamily Beudanticeratinae, which includes among others, Uhligella, Beutanticeras, and Beutantiella.

References

Further reading 
 Arkell, et al., 1957. Mesozoic Ammonoidea; Treatise on Invertebrate Paleontology, Part L. Geological Society of America and University of Kansas Press. L368.

Ammonitida
Early Cretaceous ammonites of Europe
Fossils of France
Cretaceous France
Ammonites of South America
Fossils of Colombia
Cretaceous Colombia
Barremian life
Aptian life
Fossil taxa described in 1934